Parthamaspates was a Parthian prince who ruled as a Roman client king in Mesopotamia, and later of Osroene during the early second century AD. He was the son of the Parthian emperor Osroes I.

Biography 
After spending much of his life in Roman exile, he accompanied the emperor Trajan on the latter's campaign to conquer Parthia. Trajan originally planned to annex Ctesiphon as part of the Roman Empire, but ultimately decided instead to place Parthamaspates on his father's throne as a Roman client, doing so in 116. Trajan effectively crowned Parthamaspates as a king of Parthia.

Following Roman withdrawal from the area, Osroes easily defeated Parthamaspates and reclaimed the Parthian throne.

After his defeat in Parthia, Parthamaspates again fled to the Romans who then, as a consolation, granted him the co-rule of Osroene, a small Roman client state between Asia Minor and Syria. He was king of Osroene together with Yalur from 118 to 122, and afterwards sole ruler to 123.

From his territory of Osroene, he is known to have traded with the Kushan Empire, goods being sent by sea and through the Indus River.

Long after the failure of Parthamaspates, Rome still claimed to have control of Parthian land, as shown in a coin of Antoninus Pius (138-161 AD) with the image of a subdued "Parthia" offering the crown to him.

References

Sources
  Clément Huart & Louis Delaporte, L'Iran antique : Élam et Perse et la civilisation iranienne, Albin Michel, coll. « L'Évolution de l'Humanité », Paris, 1943, .
 

2nd-century Parthian monarchs
Roman client rulers
2nd-century monarchs in the Middle East
Kings of Osroene
People of the Roman–Parthian Wars
2nd-century Iranian people
Iranian exiles